Notre-Dame-de-la-Salette is a municipality in the Outaouais region of Quebec, Canada. It is part of the Papineau Regional County Municipality, straddling the eastern banks of the Du Lièvre River.

History
In 1841, the Township of Portland, named after the Isle of Portland in Dorset, England, was formed. From 1845 on, it was colonized by Irish and French Canadians, followed by Norwegians in 1860. A year later in 1861, the township was reorganized as a township municipality. A post office followed in 1883. French priests established a parish in 1905, named after the French pilgrimage location Notre-Dame-de-la-Salette.

During the early morning hours of April 26, 1908, a deadly landslide killed at least 34 people while sending 15 homes into the Lievre River including the residence of then-mayor Camille Lapointe. As the river was blocked by mud and land, a wave was sent into the village damaging or destroying several other structures. The toll could have been larger as a few years before the event the closure of a mine forced over 200 families to leave the village. Other major landslides were recorded in the village, twice in 1900 and in 1912 where several key infrastructures were demolished and swept away. A major fire also destroyed a large section of the village in 1903.

In 1966, Portland was renamed to Notre-Dame-de-la-Salette. On January 1, 1975, it was merged into a new City of Buckingham. However, because of public outcry, the merger did not last long. In 1980, Notre-Dame-de-la-Salette regained its municipal autonomy.

On January 1, 2022, Notre-Dame-de-la-Salette was transferred from Les Collines-de-l'Outaouais Regional County Municipality to Papineau Regional County Municipality.

Demographics

Mother tongue:
 English as first language: 6.0%
 French as first language: 91.1%
 English and French as first language: 1.8%
 Other as first language: 1.8%

See also
 List of municipalities in Quebec

References

External links

 Official website

Incorporated places in Outaouais
Municipalities in Quebec